Ambulyx obliterata is a moth of the family Sphingidae first described by Walter Rothschild in 1920.

Distribution 
It is found in Sumatra, Peninsular Malaysia and Borneo.

Description

References

External links
"Ambulyx obliterata (Rothschild, 1920)". The Sphingidae of Southeast-Asia. Archived July 7, 2011.

Ambulyx
Moths described in 1920
Moths of Asia